Triune may refer to:

 Trinity, the Godhead in Christianity
 Any of the triple deities
 Triune, Tennessee, an unincorporated town in the United States
 Triune, West Virginia, an unincorporated town in the United States
 Triune Peaks, three peaks in Graham Land, Antarctica
 Triune Masonic Temple, St. Paul, Minnesota, United States, on the National Register of Historic Places
 Bostick Female Academy, also known as Triune School, Triune, Tennessee, on the National Register of Historic Places

See also 
 Triune brain theory
 Triune Kingdom, a historic term
 Triune Continuum Paradigm
 Triedinstvo (meaning "Triune"), a split CD by Kolovrat, Arya Varta and Kamaedzitca
Trichotomy (disambiguation)